The 2020–21 National League season was the 83rd season of Swiss professional ice hockey and the fourth season as the National League (NL).

ZSC Lions were the defending regular season winners. Due to the 2020 coronavirus outbreak in Switzerland there was no defending champion as the previous season's playoffs were cancelled.

Due to the 2019–20 league qualification series also being cancelled, the participating teams remained the same as the previous season.

The league announced changes to the format ahead of the season, meaning that 52 games rather than 50 would be played in the regular season. The playoffs would also be re-formatted, so that the top 6 teams now qualified directly for the quarter-finals, with the next four teams playing in pre-playoffs for the remaining two spots. There would also be no relegation from the season. The two pre-playoffs series were played in a best-of-three, the quarter finals in a best-of-seven and the semi-finals and final in a best-of-five. The series were shortened to allow enough time for the national team to prepare for the 2021 IIHF World Championship.

EV Zug won the regular season with 6 games remaining, having already clinched their club record points total, surpassing their previous best of 98 points from the 2011–12 season. With two games remaining EV Zug broke the record for most points in a single regular season, held by HC Davos from the 2010–11 season. Whilst this season was the first to be 52 games in length, EV Zug passed the milestone in the same number of games as the previous record holders.

EV Zug swept Genève-Servette HC 3-0 in the final to win its first NL title since 1998.

Teams

Regular season

Due to coronavirus cases in both EHC Biel and SC Bern forcing late season stoppages to training, not all regular season games could be completed, and the league would use points per game to determine the final regular season standings.

Player statistics

Scoring leaders

The following players led the league in points, at the conclusion of the regular season. If two or more skaters were tied (i.e. same number of points, goals and played games), all of the tied skaters were shown.

Leading goaltenders
The following goaltenders led the league in goals against average, provided that they have played at least 40% of their team's minutes, at the conclusion of the regular season.

Playoffs

Bracket

Pre-playoffs

(7) EHC Biel vs. (10) SC Rapperswil-Jona Lakers

(8) HC Davos vs. (9) SC Bern

Quarter-finals

(1) EV Zug vs. (9) SC Bern

(2) HC Lugano vs. (10) SC Rapperswil-Jona Lakers

(3) HC Fribourg-Gottéron vs. (6) Genève-Servette HC

(4) Lausanne HC vs. (5) ZSC Lions

Semi-finals

(1) EV Zug vs. (10) SC Rapperswil-Jona Lakers

(5) ZSC Lions vs. (6) Genève-Servette HC

Final (1) EV Zug vs. (6) Genève-Servette HC

References

External links
 
 

1
Swiss
National League (ice hockey) seasons